Cao Wei is a Chinese professor of archaeology. He is currently serving as the chief curator of the Terracotta Army museum in Xi'an, China. In 2010, he and his archaeological team received the Prince of Asturias Awards in social sciences.

Career 

In 2012, he welcomed Myanmar's president Thein Sein to the Terracotta Army museum. In 2013, he accompanied South Korea's president Park Geun-hye and her delegation to visit the Terracotta Army.

In 2014, he led US First Lady Michelle Obama through the archeological site.

Awards 

In 2010, Cao Wei and his team received the Prince of Asturias Awards in Social Sciences for their archaeological discoveries.

Books

References 

Recipients of Princess of Asturias Awards
Chinese archaeologists
Living people
Year of birth missing (living people)